Eloise Mignon (born 18 September 1986) is an Australian actress. She began her career starring in children's television shows: The Legacy of the Silver Shadow and Silversun before appearing in the Australian soap opera Neighbours. Mignon possesses multiple citizenship, including Australia, France and the United States.

Early life
Mignon was born in Melbourne to French director Jean-Pierre Mignon, and Katharine Sturak, an American. Mignon was educated at Melbourne Girls College, Wesley College and St Michael's Grammar School.

Career
Mignon worked from a young age in independent theatre, notably with The Black Lung Theatre and Whaling Firm in their multi award-winning production Rubeville where she played Trixi.

Her screen credits include a role in Legacy of the Silver Shadow and a main character Mara Lomax in children's sci-fi series Silversun. She also appears as a prostitute in the Australian film Three Blind Mice (2008), directed by Matthew Newton

From 23 July 2007, Mignon began appearing as Bridget Parker in the soap opera, Neighbours. In March 2009, it was announced that Mignon had quit the show. The character of Bridget died from injuries sustained in a car accident. Mignon announced that her reason for leaving the show was so that she could return to studying an Arts degree at the University of Melbourne.

Mignon performed as Jennifer in the play In A Dark Dark House at the Red Stitch Actors Theatre in Melbourne until 22 August 2009. She performed for the Melbourne Theatre Company in The Grenade, and Return to Earth. In 2010 Mignon appeared in City Homicide as Layla.

Since 2010 Mignon has primarily worked in professional theatre in Australia and France. In 2011 Mignon played the role of Hedvig in Belvoir's production of the Henrik Ibsen play The Wild Duck opposite Toby Schmitz and Anita Hegh, directed by Simon Stone. Her performance was praised with one critic commenting "Mignon articulates the young girl's confusion in heartbreaking fashion". The production was invited to perform at the International Ibsen Festival in Oslo as well as the Weiner Festowchen and Holland Festival. Mignon's performance was critically very well regarded.

In 2012 Mignon returned to the Belvoir stage appearing first in Every Breath by writer and director Benedict Andrews, followed by Strange Interlude where she interpreted Madeleine with director Simon Stone, and a new production of the Noël Coward play Private Lives. In 2013 she returned to work with Simon Stone on The Cherry Orchard for Melbourne Theatre Company where she interpreted Anya. Mignon appeared in the third series of Miss Fisher's Murder Mysteries in 2015.

From 2014 to 2016 she collaborated on and performed in two projects with the German auteur Falk Richter- Complexity of Belonging in conjunction with choreographer Anouk van Dijk for Chunky Move and Je Suis Fassbinder with French theatre director Stanislas Nordey at the Théâtre National de Strasbourg and Théâtre National de la Colline, Paris. Both projects were written with her in mind; she performs the role 'Eloise'.

Mignon has a Bachelor of Arts (Honours Degree) from the University of Melbourne.

Filmography

References

1986 births
Living people
Actresses from Melbourne
Australian people of American descent
Australian people of French descent
Australian soap opera actresses
People educated at St Michael's Grammar School
People educated at Wesley College (Victoria)